Stegiacantha is a fungal genus in the family Meruliaceae. It is a monotypic genus, containing the single species Stegiacantha petaloides, found in Madagascar. This fungus was first described by American mycologist Curtis Gates Lloyd in 1913 as Hydnum petaloides. Rudolph Arnold Maas Geesteranus circumscribed Stegiacantha to contain the fungus in 1966.

It has yellowish spines covering its hymenium.

References

Fungi of Africa
Meruliaceae
Monotypic Polyporales genera
Taxa described in 1966
Taxa named by Rudolf Arnold Maas Geesteranus